Al Khalis District, Khalis or Al Khales is one of the six districts of Diyala Governorate in Iraq. Its main population center is the village of the same name. The village of Al Khalis is roughly 15 kilometers (9 mi) north of Baqubah.

The Khalis District houses the terrorist organization, the Mujahedin-e Khalq (PMOI, MEK, MKO) in Camp Ashraf. They are currently being protected by the U.S. military and Bulgarian Army, on Forward Operating Base Grizzly. Ashraf City residents are all considered as "protected persons," under the Fourth Geneva Convention.

Towns and villages in the district
 Ashraf City
 Marfu Village
 Village of Nye
 Udame
 Al Khalis
 Al Mansouryah

References

Districts of Diyala Province